Qahveh Khaneh Sign Language, literally Coffee House Sign Language, is a deaf sign language of a few elderly members of the deaf community in Tehran. It has been in use since 1900 or earlier. It is unknown if it is related to Iranian Sign Language; it is possible that it descends from an ancestral form of Iranian Sign Language, dating to before that language was standardized.

References

Sign languages
Sign languages of Iran